Step One Records was an independent American record label established in February 1984 in Nashville, Tennessee. The label was founded by singer-songwriter and producer Ray Pennington with Curtis Potter, the former of whom had produced for Waylon Jennings. At the time of the label's foundation, it was one of the few independent country music labels to have significant chart success, most notably in 1991, when the label released Clinton Gregory's "(If It Weren't for Country Music) I'd Go Crazy", the only independently released single on the Billboard country charts at the time of its release. The label lasted into the mid 1990s, having more visibility with Western Flyer's "Cherokee Highway" and "What Will You Do With M-E?". Other artists signed to the label included Ashley Evans, The Geezinslaws, Ray Price, Faron Young, and Pennington himself. The label closed in 1998 and the catalog is owned by Gusto Music.

Roster
Matt Benson
Sheryl Brewer
Don Cox
Buddy Emmons
Dawnett Faucett
The Geezinslaws
Clinton Gregory
The Kendalls
Jerry Lansdowne
Charlie McCoy
Terry McMillan
Ray Pennington
Celinda Pink
Ray Price
Bryan Smith
Cal Smith
Gene Watson
Kitty Wells
Western Flyer
Faron Young

References

External links
 

American country music record labels
Record labels established in 1984
Record labels disestablished in 1998
American independent record labels